Kipanga Football Club, or simply Kipanga is a football club from Africa based in Zanzibar.

The team won the Zanzibar Premier League in 2000.

Achievements
Zanzibar Premier League : 1
 2000

Performance in CAF competitions
CAF Confederation Cup: 1 appearance
2005 – Preliminary Round

Current Players

Stadium
Currently the team plays at the Kipanga Stadium.

References

External links
 –

Football clubs in Tanzania
Zanzibari football clubs